In combinatorial mathematics and theoretical computer science, a permutation pattern is a sub-permutation of a longer permutation. Any permutation may be written in one-line notation as a sequence of digits representing the result of applying the permutation to the digit sequence 123...; for instance the digit sequence 213 represents the permutation on three elements that swaps elements 1 and 2. If  π and σ are two permutations represented in this way (these variable names are standard for permutations and are unrelated to the number pi), then π is said to contain σ as a pattern if some subsequence of the digits of π has the same relative order as all of the digits of σ.

For instance, permutation π contains the pattern 213 whenever π has three digits x, y, and z that appear within π in the order x...y...z but whose values are ordered as y < x < z, the same as the ordering of the values in the permutation 213. The permutation 32415 on five elements contains 213 as a pattern in several different ways: 3··15, ··415, 32··5, 324··, and ·2·15 all form triples of digits with the same ordering as 213. Each of the subsequences 315, 415, 325, 324, and 215 is called a copy, instance, or occurrence of the pattern. The fact that π contains σ is written more concisely as σ ≤ π. If a permutation π does not contain a pattern σ, then π is said to avoid σ. The permutation 51342 avoids 213; it has 10 subsequences of three digits, but none of these 10 subsequences has the same ordering as 213.

Early results 
A case can be made that  was the first to prove a result in the field with his study of "lattice permutations".  In particular MacMahon shows that the permutations which can be divided into two decreasing subsequences (i.e., the 123-avoiding permutations) are counted by the Catalan numbers.

Another early landmark result in the field is the Erdős–Szekeres theorem; in permutation pattern language, the theorem states that for any positive integers a and b every permutation of length at least   must contain either the pattern  or the pattern .

Computer science origins 
The study of permutation patterns began in earnest with Donald Knuth's consideration of stack-sorting in 1968.  Knuth showed that the permutation π can be sorted by a stack if and only if π avoids 231, and that the stack-sortable permutations are enumerated by the Catalan numbers.  Knuth also raised questions about sorting with deques.  In particular, Knuth's question asking how many permutation of n elements are obtainable with the use of a deque remains open.  Shortly thereafter,  investigated sorting by networks of stacks, while  showed that the permutation π can be sorted by a deque if and only if for all k, π avoids 5,2,7,4,...,4k+1,4k−2,3,4k,1, and 5,2,7,4,...,4k+3,4k,1,4k+2,3, and every permutation that can be obtained from either of these by interchanging the last two elements or the 1 and the 2.  Because this collection of permutations is infinite (in fact, it is the first published example of an infinite antichain of permutations), it is not immediately clear how long it takes to decide if a permutation can be sorted by a deque.   later presented a linear (in the length of π) time algorithm which determines if π can be sorted by a deque.

In his paper, Pratt remarked that this permutation pattern order “seems to be the only partial order on permutation that arises in a simple and natural way” and concludes by noting that “from an abstract point of view”, the permutation pattern order “is even more interesting than the networks we were characterizing”.

Enumerative origins 

A prominent goal in the study of permutation patterns is in the enumeration of permutations avoiding a fixed (and typically short) permutation or set of permutations. Let Avn(B) denote the set of permutations of length n which avoid all of the permutations in the set B (in the case B is a singleton, say β, the abbreviation Avn(β) is used instead). As noted above, MacMahon and Knuth showed that |Avn(123)| = |Avn(231)|  = Cn, the nth Catalan number. Thus these are isomorphic combinatorial classes.

 was the first paper to focus solely on enumeration.  Among other results, Simion and Schmidt counted even and odd permutations avoiding a pattern of length three, counted permutations avoiding two patterns of length three, and gave the first bijective proof that 123- and 231-avoiding permutations are equinumerous.  Since their paper, many other bijections have been given, see  for a survey.

In general, if |Avn(β)| = |Avn(σ)| for all n, then β and σ are said to be Wilf-equivalent.  Many Wilf-equivalences stem from the trivial fact that |Avn(β)| = |Avn(β−1)| = |Avn(βrev)| for all n, where β−1 denotes the inverse of β and βrev denotes the reverse of β.  (These two operations generate the Dihedral group D8 with a natural action on permutation matrices.)  However, there are also numerous examples of nontrivial Wilf-equivalences (such as that between 123 and 231):

  proved that the permutations 1342 and 2413 are Wilf-equivalent.
  proved that for any permutation β, the permutations 231 ⊕ β and 312 ⊕ β are Wilf-equivalent, where ⊕ denotes the direct sum operation.
  proved that for any permutation β and any positive integer m, the permutations 12..m ⊕ β and m...21 ⊕ β are Wilf-equivalent.

From these two Wilf-equivalences and the inverse and reverse symmetries, it follows that there are three different sequences |Avn(β)| where β is of length four:

In the late 1980s, Richard Stanley and Herbert Wilf conjectured that for every permutation β, there is some constant K such that |Avn(β)| < Kn.  This was known as the Stanley–Wilf conjecture until it was proved by Adam Marcus and Gábor Tardos.

Closed classes 

A closed class, also known as a pattern class, permutation class, or simply class of permutations is a downset in the permutation pattern order.  Every class can be defined by the minimal permutations which do not lie inside it, its basis.  Thus the basis for the stack-sortable permutations is {231}, while the basis for the deque-sortable permutations is infinite.  The generating function for a class is Σ x|π| where the sum is taken over all permutations π in the class.

Möbius function 
The goal in such investigations is to find a formula for the Möbius function of an interval [σ, π] in the permutation pattern poset which is more efficient than the naïve recursive definition.
Later,  generalized this result to intervals of separable permutations.

It is known that, asymptotically, at least 39.95% of all permutations π of length n satisfy μ(1, π)=0 (that is, the principal Möbius function is equal to zero), but for each n there exist permutations π such that μ(1, π) is an exponential function of n.

Computational complexity 

However, PPM can be solved in linear time when k is a constant.

There are several variants on the PPM problem, as surveyed by Bruner and Lackner. For example, if the match is required to consist of contiguous entries then the problem can be solved in polynomial time.

Another variant is when both the pattern and text are restricted to a proper permutation class , in which case the problem is called -PPM. For example, Guillemot and Vialette showed that -PPM could be solved in  time. They further asked if the -PPM problem can be solved in polynomial time for every fixed proper permutation class .

Packing densities 
The permutation π is said to be β-optimal if no permutation of the same length as π has more copies of β.  In his address to the SIAM meeting on Discrete Mathematics in 1992, Wilf defined the packing density of the permutation β of length k as

 

An unpublished argument of Fred Galvin shows that the quantity inside this limit is nonincreasing for n ≥ k, and so the limit exists.  When β is monotone, its packing density is clearly 1, and packing densities are invariant under the group of symmetries generated by inverse and reverse, so for permutations of length three, there is only one nontrivial packing density.  Walter Stromquist (unpublished) settled this case by showing that the packing density of 132 is 2 − 3, approximately 0.46410.

For permutations β of length four, there are (due to symmetries) seven cases to consider:

For the three unknown permutations, there are bounds and conjectures.   used an approximation algorithm which suggests that the packing density of 1324 is around 0.244.  Birzhan Batkeyev (unpublished) constructed a family of permutations showing that the packing density of 1342 is at least the product of the packing densities of 132 and 1432, approximately 0.19658.  This is conjectured to be the precise packing density of 1342.   provided a lower bound on the packing density of 2413.  This lower bound, which can be expressed in terms of an integral, is approximately 0.10474, and conjectured to be the true packing density.

Superpatterns 

A k-superpattern is a permutation that contains all permutations of length k. For example, 25314 is a 3-superpattern because it contains all 6 permutations of length 3. It is known that k-superpatterns must have length at least k2/e2, where e ≈ 2.71828 is Euler's number, and that there exist k-superpatterns of length ⌈(k2 + 1)/2⌉.
This upper bound is conjectured to be best possible, up to lower-order terms.

Generalizations
There are several ways in which the notion of "pattern" has been generalized. For example, a vincular pattern is a permutation containing dashes indicating the entries that need not occur consecutively (in the normal pattern definition, no entries need to occur consecutively). For example, the permutation 314265 has two copies of the dashed pattern 2-31-4, given by the entries 3426 and 3425. For a dashed pattern β and any permutation π, we write β(π) for the number of copies of β in π. Thus the number of inversions in π is 2-1(π), while the number of descents is 21(π). Going further, the number of valleys in π is 213(π) + 312(π), while the number of peaks is 231(π) + 132(π). For example, the Major index of π is equal to 1-32(π) + 2-31(π) + 3-21(π) + 21(π).

Another generalization is that of a barred pattern, in which some of the entries are barred. For π to avoid the barred pattern β means that every set of entries of π which form a copy of the nonbarred entries of β can be extended to form a copy of all entries of β.   introduced these types of patterns in his study of permutations which could be sorted by passing them twice through a stack. (Note that West's definition of sorting twice through a stack is not the same as sorting with two stacks in series.)

References

External links

A conference on permutation patterns has been held annually since 2003:
 Permutation Patterns 2003, February 10–14, 2003, University of Otago, Dunedin, New Zealand.
 Permutation Patterns 2004, July 5–9, 2004, Malaspina University-College, Nanaimo, British Columbia, Canada.
 Permutation Patterns 2005, March 7–11, 2005, University of Florida, Gainesville, Florida, USA.
 Permutation Patterns 2006, June 12–16, 2006, Reykjavík University, Reykjavík, Iceland.
 Permutation Patterns 2007, June 11–15, 2007, University of St. Andrews, St. Andrews, Scotland.
 Permutation Patterns 2008, June 16–20, 2008, University of Otago, Dunedin, New Zealand.
 Permutation Patterns 2009, July 13–17, 2009, Università di Firenze, Florence, Italy.
 Permutation Patterns 2010, August 9–13, 2010, Dartmouth College, Hanover, New Hampshire, USA.
 Permutation Patterns 2011, June 20–24, 2011, California Polytechnic State University, San Luis Obispo, California, USA.
 Permutation Patterns 2012, June 11–15, 2012, University of Strathclyde, Glasgow, Scotland.
 Permutation Patterns 2013, July 1–5, 2013, Université Paris Diderot, Paris, France.
 Permutation Patterns 2014, July 7–11, 2014, East Tennessee State University, Johnson City, Tennessee, USA.
 Permutation Patterns 2015, June 15–19, 2015, De Morgan House, London, England.
 Permutation Patterns 2016, June 27–July 1, 2016, Howard University, Washington, DC, USA.
 Permutation Patterns 2017, June 26–30, 2017, Reykjavík University, Reykjavík, Iceland.
 Permutation Patterns 2018, July 9–13, 2018, Dartmouth College, Hanover, New Hampshire, USA.
 Permutation Patterns 2019, June 17–21, 2019, Universität Zürich, Zürich, Switzerland.
 Permutation Patterns 2020 Virtual Workshop, June 30–July 1, 2020, hosted by Valparaiso University, Valparaiso, Indiana, USA.
 Permutation Patterns 2021 Virtual Workshop, June 15–16, 2021, hosted by University of Strathclyde, Glasgow, Scotland.
 Permutation Patterns 2022, June 20-24, 2022, Valparaiso University, Valparaiso, Indiana, USA.
 Permutation Patterns 2023, July 3-7, 2023, University of Burgundy, Dijon, France.

American Mathematical Society Special Sessions on Patterns in Permutations have been held at the following meetings:
 Fall Eastern Sectional Meeting, September 22–23, 2012, Rochester Institute of Technology, Rochester, NY.
 Joint Mathematics Meetings, January 12, 2013, San Diego, CA.
 Central Fall Sectional Meeting, September 20–21, 2014, University of Wisconsin-Eau Claire, Eau Claire, WI.
 Spring Eastern Sectional Meeting, March 7–8, 2015, Georgetown University, Washington, DC.

Other permutation patterns meetings:
 Workshop on Permutation Patterns, May 29–June 3, 2005, University of Haifa, Haifa, Israel.
 Pattern Avoidance and Genome Sorting, February 14-19, 2016, Schloss Dagstuhl, Wadern, Germany.
 Genomics, Pattern Avoidance, and Statistical Mechanics, November 4-9, 2018, Schloss Dagstuhl, Wadern, Germany.
 Pattern Avoidance, Statistical Mechanics and Computational Complexity, March 19-24, 2023, Schloss Dagstuhl, Wadern, Germany.

Other links:
 PermLab: software for permutation patterns, maintained by Michael Albert.
 Database of Permutation Pattern Avoidance, maintained by Bridget Tenner.
 PermPAL: The Permutation Pattern Avoidance Library, a database of algorithmically-derived theorems about permutation classes, maintained by Christian Bean, Émile Nadeau, Jay Pantone and Henning Ulfarsson.